Laisse tes mains sur mes hanches (Leave Your Hands on My Hips) is a 2003 French comedy film directed, written and starring Chantal Lauby.

Plot
Odile Rousselet is an actress of 42 years who lives with Mary, her 18-year-old daughter. When this one leaves to move in with her boyfriend, she finds herself alone and decided to get out more. It was at the carnival she makes new friends ...

Cast

 Chantal Lauby as Odile Rousselet
 Claude Perron as Nathalie
 Rossy de Palma as Myriam Bardem
 Jean-Hugues Anglade as Jérôme
 Jean-Pierre Martins as Kader
 Armelle Deutsch as Marie
 Alain Chabat as Bernard
 Dominique Besnehard as Gérald
 Françoise Lépine as Hélène
 Hélène Duc as Madame Tatin
 Maurice Chevit as Robert
 Françoise Bertin as Monique
 Dorothée Jemma as Alice
 Christophe Debonneuil as Guillaume
 Boris Terral as Eric
 Olga Sékulic as Aurélie
 Candide Sanchez as Guitou
 Jérôme Bertin as Jean-Pôl
 Jean-Luc Borras as Kevin
 Thomas Derichebourg as Miche
 David Saracino as Idir
 Khalid Maadour as Rachid
 Michaël Aragones as Pedro
 Dominique Farrugia as The dredger 
 Claudie Ossard as The blond girl in the car
 Frédérique Bel as The girl near Pulpo
 Myriam Boyer as The concierge
 Bernard Menez as The concierge
 Daniel Isoppo as The concierge's friend
 Tatiana Gousseff as The assistant director

Cameo
 Salvatore Adamo 
 Stéphane Bern
 Tony Gatlif

References

External links

2003 films
French comedy films
2000s French films